"Millie Pulled a Pistol on Santa/Keepin' the Faith" is a double A-side single by De La Soul released in 1991 off their album, De La Soul Is Dead.

"Millie Pulled a Pistol on Santa" is a tragic tale of a fictional girl and her father who sexually molests her. The song begins with the group describing Millie:

She had the curves that made you wanna take chances 
I mean on her, man, I'd love to make advances 
I guess her father must 'a got the same feelin' 
I mean, actually findin' his own daughter Millie appealing 
At the time no one knew but it was a shame 
That Millie became a victim of the touchy-touchy game

Although Millie tells others about the abuse, no one believes her. Eventually she procures a gun, heads for the Macy's in which her father is working as a department store Santa, and shoots him.

In contrast, the b-side, "Keepin' the Faith" is an upbeat song featuring vocals by Vinia Mojica, in which the group talks of trying to be intimate with a stuck up girl whose only concern is money.

Producer Prince Paul would later revive one of the samples in the Full Mix of "Millie Pulled a Pistol on Santa" to use in "Mommy, What's a Gravedigga?" by Gravediggaz.

Hip-Hop duo Atmosphere recorded a sequel, titled "Millie Fell off the Fire Escape," on their free mixtape Leak at Will in 2009. In Atmosphere's song, Millie runs away after murdering her father, contemplates going back to tell the police that she killed her father because of the sexual abuse he put her through, but instead keeps running until she sees an abandoned factory. As she climbs a ladder to get into the building, the police finally catch up with her and tell her to come down. Millie slips, falls off the ladder, and dies when she hits the ground.

Another hip-hop duo Company Flow reiterated this song instrumentally to make "Suzy Pulled A Pistol on Henry" on their second and last album Little Johnny from the Hospitul: Breaks & Instrumentals Vol.1.

In "Keepin' the Faith", the music video shows a Huey Duck plush from DuckTales.

Track listing
"Millie Pulled a Pistol on Santa" (Full Mix) - 4:04
Engineering: Bob Power
"Keepin' the Faith" (Straight Pass) - 4:33
Guest Appearance: Vinia Mojica
"Keepin' the Faith" (12" UK Mix) - 7:19
Guest Appearance: Vinia Mojica
"Keepin' the Faith" (No Bass Mix) - 4:34
Guest Appearance: Vinia Mojica
"Keepin' the Faith" (LP Version) - 4:45
Guest Appearance: Vinia Mojica
"Millie Pulled a Pistol on Santa" (Full Mix Instrumental) - 4:02
Engineering: Bob Power
"Keepin' the Faith" (Straight Pass Instrumental) - 4:31
"Keepin' the Faith" (7" UK Mix) - 3:48
Guest Appearance: Vinia Mojica

List of samples
"Millie Pulled a Pistol on Santa"
"I'll Stay" and "Mommy, What's a Funkadelic?" by Funkadelic
"Givin' It Up Is Givin' Up" by Patrice Rushen
"Synthetic Substitution" by Melvin Bliss

"Keepin' the Faith"
"Could You Be Loved?" by Bob Marley
"Sign of the Times" by Bob James
"Just a Touch of Love" by Slave
"Johnny the Fox Meets Jimmy the Weed" by Thin Lizzy
"Over Like a Fat Rat" by Fonda Rae
"Walk This Way" by Aerosmith

Charts

1991 singles
1991 songs
American Christmas songs
De La Soul songs
Songs about child abuse
Song recordings produced by Prince Paul (producer)
Tommy Boy Records singles
Songs written by David Jude Jolicoeur
Songs written by Vincent Mason
Songs written by Kelvin Mercer
Songs written by Prince Paul (producer)
Patricide in fiction